Dilta is a genus of primitive insects belonging to the family Machilidae. These insects are slender and wingless with dull, often mottled, colouring. They are typically found on the ground in heavily vegetated places. Dilta spp are restricted to western Europe and parts of north Africa.

References
Chinery, Michael, Collins Guide to the Insects of Britain and Western Europe 1986 (Reprinted 1991)
McGavin, George C., Insects and Spiders 2004
Fauna Europaea

Archaeognatha
Taxa named by Embrik Strand
Insect genera